The 1986 Southeastern Conference baseball tournament was held at Alex Box Stadium in Baton Rouge, LA from May 9 through 11.  won the tournament and earned the Southeastern Conference's automatic bid to the 1986 NCAA Tournament.

Regular season results

Tournament

All-Tournament Team

References 

 SECSports.com All-Time Baseball Tournament Results
 SECSports.com All-Tourney Team Lists

Tournament
Southeastern Conference Baseball Tournament
Southeastern Conference baseball tournament
Southeastern Conference baseball tournament
Baseball competitions in Baton Rouge, Louisiana
College baseball tournaments in Louisiana